Valeriy Kalchenko (born 24 February 1947, in Kirovohrad) is a Ukrainian politician and a civil engineer. He was appointed Minister of Emergency Situations.

See also
 List of mayors of Kropyvnytskyi

References

External links
 Valeriy Kalchenko at the Official Ukraine Today portal

1947 births
Living people
Politicians from Kropyvnytskyi
Governors of Kirovohrad Oblast
All-Ukrainian Union "Fatherland" politicians
Seventh convocation members of the Verkhovna Rada
Sixth convocation members of the Verkhovna Rada
Fifth convocation members of the Verkhovna Rada
Emergency ministers of Ukraine
Ukrainian civil engineers